Giles Martin (born 9 October 1969) is an English record producer, songwriter, composer and multi-instrumentalist. His studio recordings, stage shows, TV and film works have been critically acclaimed and commercially successful around the world. He is the son of Beatles producer George Martin and half-brother of actor Gregory Paul Martin.

Education
Martin was educated at Stowe School, a boarding independent school in the civil parish of Stowe in Buckinghamshire, leaving its boarding house, Lyttelton, in 1988, followed by the University of Manchester.

Life and career
Martin grew up without much awareness of the Beatles and was discouraged by his father from pursuing a career in music lest the inevitable comparisons should be made between father and son. However, Giles carried on, first playing in the band Velvet Jones, then writing jingles in college. In 1995, he was appointed music co-director for the television and radio music countdown show, The Great Music Experience. He worked on the Party at the Palace concert to celebrate Queen Elizabeth II's Golden Jubilee, for which he also produced the subsequent album and DVD.

In 2004 he produced Hayley Westenra's multi-platinum album Pure, the UK's fastest-selling classical album of all time. Other acts Martin has worked with include Kula Shaker, Jeff Beck, Elvis Costello, INXS, Kate Bush, Elton John and the Rolling Stones.

In 2006 Martin collaborated with his father to remix, rearrange, and recombine the music of the Beatles into a soundscape for Love, a theatrical production of Cirque du Soleil, which opened at the Mirage in Las Vegas. His use of digital music production and manipulation techniques allowed him to create Love'''s musical mash-ups, which he updated in 2016 for the show's 10th anniversary. He produced the music for the final Broadway performance of Rent and worked with Martin Scorsese on his George Harrison film documentary Living in the Material World. Further film collaborations include working with Ron Howard on his Beatles documentary feature Eight Days A Week and the British action franchise Kingsman. Martin was music director for the Elton John bio-pic Rocketman.

In 2009 Martin returned to the Beatles' catalogue with The Beatles: Rock Band, a video game that allows players to simulate performing Beatles songs with plastic instruments. Martin produced the title's music, cleaning and reworking the audio to suit the game's mechanics. In 2013, Martin produced tracks and served as executive producer on Paul McCartney's New album. He was the producer in charge of the 50th anniversary Beatles remix/deluxe editions of Sgt. Pepper's Lonely Hearts Club Band (2017), the White Album (2018), Abbey Road (2019), Let It Be (2021), and Revolver (2022). Martin was music supervisor for the documentary series The Beatles: Get Back, as well as music mixer along with Sam Okell.

Martin has served as Head of Sound Experience since 2014 at Sonos Inc., a company that builds wireless home audio systems. In late 2018, Martin was appointed as Head of Audio & Sound of the Universal Music Group. The role was specifically created for Martin where he is based at UMG's Abbey Road Studios.

Personal life
Martin is married to Melanie Gore-Grimes. They have two children and live in London, England.

Awards
Martin has received two Grammy awards, both in 2007 for the Love soundtrack album, as a producer of the Best Compilation Soundtrack Album For Motion Picture, Television Or Other Visual Media and as a surround producer of the Best Surround Sound Album.

In 2022, he won an Emmy award for his work on The Beatles: Get Back.

Selected works
 1994 The K's (also known as Kula Shaker) (GUT)
 1994 My Life Story (Mother Tongue)
 1995 The Glory of Gershwin (Mercury)
 1995 The Choir (BBC)
 1995 The Great Music Experience
 1995/96 The Beatles Anthology (EMI/Apple)
 1996 Monorail – Hairdressing (Edel)
 1996/97/98 Velvet Jones (Naked)
 1996/97 In My Life (Echo/MCA)
 2000/01 The Alice Band (Instant Karma/Sony)
 2002 Party at the Palace – Live show, CD and DVD releases (EMI/Virgin)
 2003 Hayley Westenra – Pure (Universal/Decca)
 2004 Willard White – My Way (Sony/BMG)
 2004/05 Hayley Westenra – Odyssey (Universal/Decca)
 2004/05/06 – Love (Apple/Cirque du Soleil/MGM/EMI)
 2007 Kim Richey – Chinese Boxes (Vanguard)
 2007 Paco Peña – Requiem 2008 RENT – Live on Broadway (Sony Pictures)
 2008/09 The Beatles Rock Band (MTV Networks)
 2009/10/11 George Harrison: Living in the Material World 2012 George Harrison – Early Takes: Volume 1 (UMe)
 2013 Paul McCartney – New (Hear Music)
 2015 The Beatles – 1+ (Apple)
 2016 The Beatles – Live at the Hollywood Bowl 2017 The Beatles – Sgt. Pepper's Lonely Hearts Club Band: 50th Anniversary Edition 2018 The Beatles – The Beatles: 50th Anniversary Edition (the "White Album": 50th Anniversary Edition
 2019 Rocketman – music director for Elton John biopic, directed by Dexter Fletcher
 2019 The Beatles – Abbey Road: 50th Anniversary Edition 
 2020 The Rolling Stones – Goats Head Soup 2020 
 2021 Original Sin – The Seven Sins
 2021 The Beatles – Let It Be: Special Edition
 2021 The Beatles: Get Back.
 2022 The Beatles – Revolver: Special Edition

References

Further reading
Giles talks to Alexis Petridis about producing "LOVE"
Interview with both Martins regarding "LOVE"
Technical article on production, Giles Martin talks to Harvey Kubernik
Rolling Stone Sgt.Pepper remix review
Giles Martin working with Sonos
Why The Beatles Revolver is a Monument to the Collaborative Spirit

External links

Giles Martin – Management biography
Apple podcasts
Giles Martin video interview
Giles talks with NPR about the Sgt.Pepper remix
The Beatles Eight Days A Week

1969 births
Alumni of the University of Manchester
English multi-instrumentalists
English record producers
English songwriters
George Martin
Grammy Award winners
Living people
People educated at Stowe School
The Beatles
Primetime Emmy Award winners